Syed Sadat Abul Masud was an Indian justice of law and a former judge at Kolkata High Court. He was one of the four members of the 6th Finance Commission of India set up by the Government of India in 1972, under the chairmanship of Kasu Brahmananda Reddy, for advising on the Centre-State finance allocations. In March 2012, when Bangladesh decided to honour the friends of the country who assisted them in the Bangladesh Liberation War of 1971, he was one among the recipients of the Friends of Liberation War Honour. The Government of India awarded him the third highest civilian honour of the Padma Bhushan, in 1985, for his contributions to society.

References 

Recipients of the Padma Bhushan in public affairs
Year of birth missing
Year of death missing
People from West Bengal
20th-century Indian judges
Judges of the Calcutta High Court
Finance Commission of India